is a Japanese professional shogi player ranked 8-dan.

Promotion history
The promotion history for Ogura is as follows:
 6-kyū: 1982
 1-dan: 1986
 4-dan: October 1, 1988
 5-dan: October 28, 1992
 6-dan: May 20, 1998
 7-dan: October 24, 2005
 8-dan: April 1, 2022

References

External links
ShogiHub: Ogura, Hisashi

Japanese shogi players
Professional shogi players
Living people
1968 births
Professional shogi players from Tokyo Metropolis